MV Harbour Spirit is a vessel owned by the Gosport Ferry Company Ltd and built by Tehnomont Shipyard of Pula in Croatia.

History
Harbour Spirit was launched in November 2014. After a month of sea trials in Croatian waters, the Harbour Spirit was loaded onto the heavy lift ship MV Amoenitas for the journey to Gosport, and was delivered on March 11 2015. She entered service in July of that year.

Characteristics
She carries either 3 or 4 crew depending on the nature of the voyage.

References

External links

Gosport Ferry
Ferries of England
Ships built in Croatia
2014 ships
Ships built in Pola